High ground is a spot of elevated terrain which can be advantageous in military tactics.

High ground may also refer to:
 Moral high ground, an ethical analogy
 High Ground (2012 film), a 2012 documentary film directed by Mike Brown
 High Ground (2020 film), an Australian film directed by Stephen Maxwell Johnson
 The High Ground (Star Trek: The Next Generation), an episode of Star Trek: The Next Generation
 "High Ground", a map on the Xbox 360 game Halo 3
 "High Ground", a short story by John McGahern
 "The High Ground", a science fiction book, written by Melinda Snodgrass
 The Highground Veterans Memorial Park west of Neillsville, Wisconsin